The papal conclave held from 18 to 20 February 1878 saw the election of Vincenzo Pecci, who took the name Leo XIII as pope. Held after the death of Pius IX, who had had the longest pontificate since Saint Peter, it was the first election of a pope who would not rule the Papal States. It was the first to meet in the Apostolic Palace in the Vatican because the venue used earlier in the 19th century, the Quirinal Palace, was now the palace of the king of Italy, Umberto I.

Questions facing the cardinals

When the cardinals assembled, they faced a dilemma. Should they choose a pope who would continue to espouse Pius IX's reactionary religious and political views, and would continue to refuse to accept Italy's Law of Guarantees guaranteeing the pope religious liberty in the Kingdom of Italy? Or should they turn away from the policies of Pius IX and choose a more liberal pope who could work for reconciliation with the king of Italy? Would choosing such a policy be seen as a betrayal of Pius IX, the self-proclaimed "prisoner in the Vatican"?

Other broader issues included Church-State relations in Italy, the Third French Republic, Ireland and the United States; the heresy Leo XIII later called Americanism; divisions in the Church caused by the proclamation of papal infallibility by the First Vatican Council; and the status of the First Vatican Council, which had been halted suddenly and never concluded. The length of Pius IX's reign suggested the cardinals give special consideration to the age and health of the man they elected.

Conclave
Some 61 of 64 cardinals entered the conclave. Two others arrived too late from New York and Dublin to participate and one did not attend for health reasons. Three of the 61 had participated in the previous conclave in 1846: Luigi Amat di San Filippo e Sorso, Fabio Maria Asquini, and Domenico Carafa della Spina di Traetto.

With what many churchmen believed was the "unstable" and "anti-Catholic" situation in a Rome that was no longer controlled by the Church, some cardinals, notably Cardinal Manning, Archbishop of Westminster, urged that the conclave be moved outside Rome, perhaps even to Malta. However the Camerlengo, Vincenzo Gioacchino Raffaele Luigi Pecci, advocated otherwise, and an initial vote among cardinals to move to Spain was overturned in a later vote. The conclave finally assembled in the Sistine Chapel in the Vatican on 18 February 1878.

Going into the conclave, Cardinal Pecci was the one candidate favored to be elected, in part because many of the cardinals who headed to Rome had already decided to elect him. In addition to Pecci's competent administration as Camerlengo during the brief sede vacante period up to the conclave, Pecci was seen as the opposite of Pope Pius IX in terms of manner and temperament, and had also had a successful diplomatic career prior to being Archbishop-Bishop of Perugia. Pecci's election was also facilitated in that Alessandro Franchi, the candidate favored by the conservatives, urged his supporters to switch their support to the Camerlengo.

One account reported the voting tabulations without providing its source.

Ballot 1 (morning 19 February)

On the first ballot, held on the morning of 19 February the votes were

 Vincenzo Gioacchino Raffaele Luigi Pecci 19 votes
 Luigi Bilio 6 votes
 Alessandro Franchi 4 votes

This ballot was ruled invalid because at least one cardinal did not mark his ballot properly.

Ballot 2 (afternoon 19 February)

 Pecci 26
 Bilio 7
 Franchi 2

Ballot 3 (morning 20 February)

 Pecci 44 – elected

Result, implications, and aftermath

The election of Cardinal Pecci, who took the name of Leo XIII, was a victory for the liberals. Pecci had been an effective bishop whose diocese had moved from the Papal States to the Kingdom of Italy successfully, without Church problems. He was seen as a diplomatic pragmatist with the tact and flexibility opponents of the previous pope believed Pius IX lacked. At 68 Leo was also young enough to do the job without hindrance of health problems, but old enough to offer the prospect of a relatively short reign of ten to fifteen years. Whereas Pius IX was seen as having isolated the Church from international opinion (his confining Jews in ghettos and his treatment of minorities had been condemned by world leaders such as Gladstone), Leo was seen as an "internationalist" who could earn back the Vatican some international respect.

Though always seemingly in poor health and delicate condition, Leo reigned for 25 years. He had the third longest reign of any pope until that time. When he died on 20 July 1903 at the age of 93 he had lived to be older than any of his known predecessors.

Participants
Arrived too late to participate
Paul Cullen, Archbishop of Dublin (Primate of Ireland)
John McCloskey, Archbishop of New York (United States)
Unavailable through ill-health
Godefroy Brossais-Saint-Marc, Archbishop of Rennes (France)

Present
Luigi Amat di San Filippo e Sorso, Dean of the College of Cardinals, cardinal-bishop of Ostia and Velletri
Camillo di Pietro, cardinal-bishop of Porto e Santa Ruffina
Carlo Sacconi, cardinal-bishop of Palestrina
Filippo Maria Guidi, cardinal-bishop of Frascati
Luigi Bilio, cardinal-bishop of Sabina
Carlo Luigi Morichini, cardinal-bishop of Albano
Friedrich Johannes Jacob Celestin von Schwarzenberg, Prince-Archbishop of Prague (Bohemia, part of Austria-Hungary)
Fabio Maria Asquini, Prefect of the Sacred Congregation of Indulgences and Sacred Relics 
Domenico Carafa della Spina di Traetto, Archbishop of Benevento
Ferdinand-François-Auguste Donnet, Bordeaux
Vincenzo Gioacchino Raffaele Luigi Pecci, Camerlengo (Papal Chamberlain), Archbishop-Bishop of Perugia (Italy)
Antonio Benedetto Antonucci, Ancona
Antonio Maria Panebianco, Prefect of the Sacred Congregation for Indulgences and Sacred Relics
Antonio Saverio De Luca, prefect of the Pontifical Congregation for Studies
Jean Baptiste François Pitra, librarian of the Vatican Library
Henri-Marie-Gaston Boisnormand de Bonnechose, Rouen
Gustav Adolph von Hohenlohe, archpriest of Santa Maria Maggiore
Lucien-Louis-Joseph-Napoleon Bonaparte, cardinal of Santa Pudenziana
Innocenzo Ferrieri, Camerlengo of the Sacred College of Cardinals
Giuseppe Berardi, Cardinal-Priest of Santi Marcellino e Pietro al Laterano
Juan Ignacio Moreno, Toledo
Raffaele Monaco La Valletta, Cardinal Vicar General of Rome
Inácio do Nascimento de Morais Cardoso, Patriarch of Lisbon
René-François Régnier, Archbishop of Cambrai (France)
Flavio Chigi, Grand Prior of Rome of the Sovereign Military Order of Malta
Alessandro Franchi, Prefect of Propagande Fide
Joseph-Hippolyte Guibert, Archbishop of Paris (France)
Luigi Oreglia di Santo Stefano, Prefect of the Sacred Congregation of Indulgences and Relics
János Simor, Esztergom
Tommaso Martinelli, Prefect of the Congregation for the Causes of Saints
Ruggero Luigi Emidio Antici Mattei
Pietro Giannelli, cardinal-priest of Sant'Agnese fuori le mura
Mieczyslaw Halka Ledóchowski, Archbishop of Gnesen and Posen, (Poland, part of the German Empire).
Henry Edward Manning, Archbishop of Westminster (Head of the Catholic Church in England and Wales).
Victor-Auguste-Isidor Deschamps, Archbishop of Mechelen (Belgium).
Giovanni Simeoni, Secretary of State of the Holy See
Domenico Bartolini, Cardinal-Priest of San Marco Evangelista al Campidoglio
Bartolomeo d'Avanzo, Bishop of Calvi e Teano (Italy)
Johann Baptist Franzelin, Jesuit theologian, Cardinal-Priest of Santi Bonifacio ed Alessio
Francisco de Paula Benavides y Navarrete, Patriarch of the West Indies
Francesco Saverio Apuzzo, Archbishop of Capua
Emmanuele Garcia Gil, Zaragoza
Edward Henry Howard, Protector of the English College at Rome
Miguel Payá y Rico, Santiago de Compostella
Louis-Marie Caverot, Lyon
Luigi di Canossa, Verona
Luigi Serafini, Viterbo
Josip Mihalovic, Zagreb
Johann Rudolf Kutschker, Archbishop of Vienna, Austria-Hungary
Lucido Parocchi, Bologna
Vincenzo Moretti, Ravenna
Antonio Pellegrini, cardinal-deacon of Santa Maria in Aquiro
Prospero Caterini, Protodeacon, Secretary of the Inquisition.
Teodolfo Mertel, Prefect of the Apostolic Signatura; the last cardinal to not be ordained to the priesthood
Domenico Consolini, Prefect of the Pontifical Roman Seminary of Sts. Peter and Paul for the Foreign Missions
Edoardo Borromeo, President of the Fabric of Saint Peter
Lorenzo Ilarione Randi, Vice-Camerlengo of the Apostolic Camera
Bartolomeo Pacca il Giovane, Cardinal-Deacon of Santa Maria in Campitelli
Lorenzo Nina, Prefect of the Congregation for Studies
Enea Sbarretti, Cardinal-Deacon of Santa Maria dei Martiri (the Pantheon)
Frédéric de Falloux du Coudray, Cardinal-Deacon of Sant'Agata de' Goti

Notes

References

External links
L’Osservatore Romano article revealing ballots in 1878 conclave 

1878 in Italy
1870s in Rome
1878 elections in Europe
1878
Pope Pius IX
19th-century Catholicism
1878 in Christianity
February 1878 events